Winter Nights or Old Norse vetrnætr was a specific time of year in medieval Scandinavia. According to Zoega's Concise Dictionary of Old Icelandic, vetr-nætr referred to "the three days which begin the winter season". The term is attested in the narrative of some of the Fornaldarsögur, mostly to express passage of time ("as autumn turned into winter").

The exact term "winter nights" is not mentioned in the Ynglinga saga by  Snorri Sturluson where (in chapter 8) the three great sacrifices of the year are prescribed:

Specific sacrifices held at the beginning of winter during the Old Norse period were  álfablót and  dísablót.
Of these, dísablót came to be a public sacrifice, according to the Ynglinga saga performed by the king of Sweden.
By contrast, álfablót was a sacrifice held at each homestead separately for the local spirits, under the explicit exclusion of any strangers.

References

Links 

Early Germanic calendar
Early Germanic festivals
Germanic paganism
Observances